Harold Frederic (August 19, 1856 – October 19, 1898) was an American journalist and novelist. His works include In the Valley (1890), The Damnation of Theron Ware (1896), and The Market Place (1899).

Life and career
Harold Henry Frederick was born in Utica, New York, on August 19, 1856, to Presbyterian parents. He attended the Methodist church, but was generally skeptical towards religion. Frederic developed an early interest in photography and journalism. After his father was killed in a railroad accident when Frederic was 18 months old, the boy was raised primarily by his mother.  He finished school at age fifteen, and soon began work as a photographer.  For four years he was a photographic touch-up artist in his hometown and in Boston.  In 1875, he began work as a proofreader for the newspaper The Utica Herald and then The Utica Daily Observer. Frederic later became a reporter. Frederic married Grace Green Williams in 1877, and they had five children together. By 1882 he was editor of the newspaper The Albany Evening Journal in the New York state capital. As editor of the Journal, Frederic was involved with politics and notably supported the future president Grover Cleveland for Governor of New York over Republican Charles J. Folger in the 1882 New York state election; and although the support cost Frederic his job when the son of a Republican senator bought the paper in 1884, Frederic became an advisor to the Governor and when Cleveland became President of the United States, their friendship opened doors for Frederic as he was establishing himself in England.

In 1884, Frederic went to live in England as London correspondent of the New York Times, and worked at this position for the rest of his life. Frederic covered topics such as the cholera epidemic in southern Europe, various wars and riots, and the Irish Home Rule movement, which he supported. It was in England that Frederic wrote his first important work of fiction, Seth's Brother's Wife (1887), which was favorably reviewed and followed by such works as The Lawton Girl (1890), In the Valley (1890), The Return of the O'Mahoney (1892), The Copperhead (1894), and Marsena (1895).

Although Frederic wrote several early stories, it was not until he published Illumination (1896), better known by its American title, The Damnation of Theron Ware, followed by Gloria Mundi (1898), that his talent as a novelist was fully realized. Damnation became a best seller and is Frederic's best known work; critic Jonathan Yardley called it "a minor classic of realism". Frederic also wrote a range of historical fiction on such topics as the American Revolution and the American Civil War. He wrote non-fiction as well, including a study on antisemitism in Russia, The New Exodus (1892), for which he went to Russia to investigate the persecution of the Jewish minority there.

In addition to the five children he had with his wife Grace, Frederic had three illegitimate children with his mistress Kate Lyon, and he established a secondary household with her in Surrey where they lived openly together. In August 1898, Frederic suffered a stroke, and as Edmund Wilson writes, "The doctors advised him to rest and to adapt himself to more temperate habits, but he dismissed their admonitions with scorn and went on smoking cigars, drinking brandy and whiskey, and riding. Kate Lyon was a Christian Scientist and called in a woman healer, who, Frederic said, 'bores my head off.'" Frederic, who did not share Lyon's faith, ignored both the doctors and Lyon's healer and eventually died, which led to a public scandal as his former wife Grace Frederic brought charges of manslaughter against Lyon and her healer, although both were later acquitted in trial. Frederic's wife also sued him for divorce just before he died.

Frederic's remains were returned to the United States and he was interred in Forest Hill Cemetery in Utica, New York.

Frederic's 1893 work The Copperhead, which dealt with the American Civil War, was adapted into a film in 2013.

Works

Novels
 (1887). Seth's Brother's Wife. New York, London.
 (1890). The Lawton Girl. Charles Scribner's Sons, New York.
 (1890). In the Valley, a story of 1777. New York, London.
 (1892). The Return of the O'Mahoney. G. W. Dillingham Co., New York. London, 1893.
 (1893). The Copperhead, Charles Scribner's Sons. New York.
 (1896). Marsena. London.
 (1896). The Damnation of Theron Ware, Stone & Kimball, New York. Also called Illumination. London, Leipzig 1896 [Belknap Press of Harvard University Press, 1960].
 (1896). March Hares. London. 
 (1898). Gloria Mundi. Chicago, New York, London.
 (1899). The Market Place. New York, London.

Collections
 (1894).  'The Copperhead' and Other Stories of the North During the American War. London.
 (1894).  'Marsena' and Other Stories of the Wartime. New York.
 (1896). Mrs. Albert Grundy: Observations in Philistia. London, New York.
 (1897). In the Sixties. 
 (1898).  'The Deserter' and Other Stories: A Book of Two Wars. Lothrop Publishing Company, Boston.
 (1966). Harold Frederic's Stories of York State.
 (2015). The Martyrdom of Maev and Other Irish Stories. Washington D.C.:The Catholic University of America Press.

Non-Fiction
 (1891). The Young Emperor William II of Germany: A Study in Character Development on a Throne. G. P. Putnam's Sons, New York.
 (1892). The New Exodus: A Study of Israel in Russia. New York, London.

Notes

References

Further reading
 Briggs, Austin (1969). The novels of Harold Frederic, Cornell University Press.
 Cargill, Oscar (1933). The Social Revolt. American Literature from 1888 to 1914, The Macmillan Company.
 Gatta, John (1997). American Madonna: Images of the Divine Woman in Literary Culture, Oxford University Press.
 Garner, Stanton (1969). Harold Frederic, University of Minnesota Press.
 Hind, C. Lewis (1922). "Harold Frederic." In More Authors and I, Dodd, Mead and Company.
 O'Donnell, Thomas Francis (1961). Harold Frederic, Twayne Publishers.
 Payne, William Morton (1902). "Harold Frederic." In Editorial Echoes, A. C. McClurg & Co.
 Ravitz, Abe C. (1960). "Harold Frederic's Venerable Copperhead". New York History. Vol 41. Is. 1. 
 Wilson, Edmund (1973). The Devils and Canon Barham, Farrar, Straus and Giroux.

External links

 
 
 
 
 Finding aid to Harold Frederick papers at Columbia University. Rare Book & Manuscript Library.

1856 births
1898 deaths
19th-century American novelists
American newspaper journalists
American male novelists
Writers from Utica, New York
19th-century American journalists
American male journalists
19th-century American male writers
Journalists from New York (state)
Novelists from New York (state)
American expatriates in England
Burials at Forest Hill Cemetery (Utica, New York)
Members of the American Academy of Arts and Letters